The Juno Award for Comedy Album of the Year is awarded as recognition for the best Canadian comedy album released in the previous year. Irregularly presented from 1979 to 1984, the award was then discontinued until the Juno Awards announced in 2017 that they would revive the category for the Juno Awards of 2018.

Winners and nominees

References

Comedy Album
Canadian comedy and humour awards
Album awards